Parornix minor is a moth of the family Gracillariidae. It is known from Honshū, Japan.

The wingspan is about 7 mm.

The larvae feed on Ericaceae species. They probably mine the leaves of their host plant.

References

Parornix
Moths of Japan
Moths described in 1965